Kalai Surkh ( Qal'ai Surkh) is a village and jamoat in Tajikistan. It is located in Rasht District, one of the Districts of Republican Subordination. The jamoat has a total population of 15,711 (2015). It consists of 21 villages, including Kalai Surkh (the seat) and Navdonak.

References

Populated places in Districts of Republican Subordination
Jamoats of Tajikistan